Yield in college admissions is the percent of students who choose to enroll in a particular college or university after having been offered admission. It is calculated by dividing the number of students who decide to enroll at a school in a given year, which is often based on their decision to pay a deposit, by the total number of offers of acceptance sent. A higher yield indicates greater interest in enrolling at a particular school of higher education. The yield rate is usually calculated once per year based on admissions' statistics. As a statistical measure, it has been used by college ratings services as a measure of selectivity, such that a higher yield rate is a sign of a more selective college. For example, the yield rate for Princeton University was 69% in 2016, while the yield rate for Dartmouth was 55%, and the yield rate for Colorado College was 37%. The yield rate has sometimes been criticized for being subject to manipulation by college admissions staffs; in 2001, a report in the Wall Street Journal by reporter Daniel Golden suggested that some college admissions departments reject or wait list well-qualified applicants on the assumption that they will not enroll, as a way to boost the college's overall yield rate; according to the report, these actions are part of an effort to improve a college's scores on the US News college ranking. This practice is known as yield protection.

References

University and college admissions